Desmiphora magnifica is a species of beetle in the family Cerambycidae. It was described by Martins and Galileo in 1995. It is known from Brazil and French Guiana.

References

Desmiphora
Beetles described in 1995